NCIS: Hawaiʻi is an American television series that premiered on CBS on September 20, 2021. The series is set in Oahu, Hawaii It stars Vanessa Lachey as Jane Tennant, the Special Agent in Charge of a fictional team of special agents from the Naval Criminal Investigative Service based in Hawaiʻi. The show is a spin-off of the long-running series NCIS and the fourth series in the NCIS franchise. The series was created by Christopher Silber, Jan Nash, and Matt Bosack who also serve as writers and executive producers alongside Larry Teng who directed multiple episodes. The series also stars Alex Tarrant, Noah Mills, Yasmine Al-Bustami, Jason Antoon, Tori Anderson and Kian Talan. In March 2022, the series was renewed for a second season which premiered on September 19, 2022. In February 2023, the series was renewed for a third season.

As of March 13, 2023, 38 episodes of NCIS: Hawaiʻi have aired.

Series overview

Episodes

Season 1 (2021–22)

Season 2 (2022–23)

Ratings

References

American television series
2020s American crime drama television series